The Unitarian Universalist Christian Fellowship (UUCF) is the main group serving Christian Unitarian Universalists within the Unitarian Universalist Association of the United States, whose main office is based in Oak Ridge, Tennessee. The UUCF was founded in Boston, Massachusetts in 1945, and can trace its roots back through the history of North American Christian Universalism and Unitarianism. As its bylaws put it:

We serve Christian Unitarians and Universalists according to their expressed religious needs; uphold and promote the Christian witness within the Unitarian Universalist Association; and uphold and promote the historic Unitarian and Universalist witness and conscience within the church universal.

They do this work by publishing quarterly (Advent/Christmas, Easter, Pentecost, and Ordinary Time) the Good News Journal, a journal of theology and spirituality for progressive and liberal Christians, and by holding a "Revival" every year, which is an opportunity for its members to gather together. Members also meet regularly at their local Unitarian Universalist congregations in UUCF-affiliated Christian spirituality covenant groups, and by engaging in sharing and discussions on the UUCF Facebook group and page and via e-mail.

See also
Revised Common Lectionary

References

External links
 
 Official website of The Good News

1945 establishments in the United States
Christian groups with universalist beliefs
Christian organizations based in the United States
Christian organizations established in the 20th century
Christian organizations established in 1945
Oak Ridge, Tennessee
Organizations based in Tennessee
Unitarian Universalist organizations